Mangawan is a town and a nagar panchayat in Rewa district in the Indian state of Madhya Pradesh.
NH 7 and  NH 27 goes through Mangawan.

Geography
It has an average elevation of 305 metres (1,000 feet).

Demographics
 India census, Mangawan had a population of 11,556. Males constitute 53% of the population and females 47%. Mangawan has an average literacy rate of 57%, lower than the national average of 59.5%: male literacy is 68%, and female literacy is 45%. In Mangawan, 18% of the population is under 6 years of age.

Transport

By Air

Nearest airport is Rewa Airport in Rewa, Madhya Pradesh.   

By Bus
Bus stand available in the city bus stand Rewa city and Mangawan.

By Train nearest railway station is Rewa railway station

References

Cities and towns in Rewa district